Steven Charles Seeger (born March 18, 1971) is a United States district judge of the United States District Court for the Northern District of Illinois.

Education 

Seeger earned his Bachelor of Arts, summa cum laude, from Wheaton College and his Juris Doctor, magna cum laude, from the University of Michigan Law School, where he was inducted into the Order of the Coif and served as both an associate and articles editor of the University of Michigan Law Review.

Legal career 

After graduation from law school he served as a law clerk to Judge David B. Sentelle of the United States Court of Appeals for the District of Columbia Circuit. After his clerkship, Seeger practiced for twelve years in the Chicago, Illinois, office of Kirkland & Ellis, where he spent his last seven years as a partner. From 2010 to 2019, Seeger served as Senior Trial Counsel in the Chicago Regional Office of the United States Securities and Exchange Commission, where he litigated cases to enforce federal securities laws on behalf of the public.

Federal judicial service 

On June 7, 2018, President Donald Trump announced his intent to nominate Seeger to serve as a United States district judge for the United States District Court for the Northern District of Illinois. On June 18, 2018, his nomination was sent to the Senate. President Trump nominated Seeger to the seat vacated by Judge James Zagel, who assumed senior status on October 21, 2016. On August 22, 2018, a hearing on his nomination was held before the Senate Judiciary Committee. On October 11, 2018, his nomination was reported out of committee by a voice vote.

On January 3, 2019, his nomination was returned to the President under Rule XXXI, Paragraph 6 of the United States Senate. On April 8, 2019, President Trump announced the renomination of Seeger to the district court. On May 21, 2019, his nomination was sent to the Senate. On June 20, 2019, his nomination was reported out of committee by a 19–3 vote. On July 30, 2019, the Senate voted 87–1 to invoke cloture on his nomination. On September 11, 2019, his nomination was confirmed by a 90–1 vote. He received his judicial commission on September 13, 2019.

References

External links 

1971 births
Living people
20th-century American lawyers
21st-century American judges
21st-century American lawyers
Judges of the United States District Court for the Northern District of Illinois
People associated with Kirkland & Ellis
People from Normal, Illinois
United States district court judges appointed by Donald Trump
University of Michigan Law School alumni
U.S. Securities and Exchange Commission personnel
Wheaton College (Illinois) alumni